Şerif Sezer (born 12 December 1946) is a Turkish actress. She is also known for her roles in Turkish cult films like Everything About Mustafa and My Father and My Son. She was born in 1946 in Mudanya and she has Rumelian, Georgian and Laz roots.

Selected filmography

References

External links
 

1946 births
Living people
Turkish film actresses
Turkish television actresses
Turkish people of Georgian descent
Turkish people of Laz descent
People from Mudanya